Haruo (written: 春雄, 春生, 春男, 春夫, 晴生, 晴男, 晴夫, 暎夫, 治夫 or 治夫) is a masculine Japanese given name. Notable people with the name include:

, Japanese footballer
, Japanese chemist
, Japanese film director
, Japanese businessman and banker
, Japanese singer
, Japanese actor
, Japanese singer
, Japanese novelist
, Japanese voice actor
, Japanese water polo player
, Japanese director
, Japanese watchmaker
Haruo Takeuchi, Japanese Paralympic athlete
, Japanese actor
, Japanese photographer
, Japanese long-distance runner
, Japanese militant
, Japanese golfer
, Japanese swimmer

Japanese masculine given names